Yaputih is a village in Tehoru district, Central Maluku Regency in Maluku Province, Indonesia. Its population is 1524.

Climate
Yaputih has a cool subtropical highland climate (Cfb) with heavy rainfall year-round.

References

Populated places in Maluku (province)